Juan Sorazábal (1904-1944) was a Paraguayan painter and draughtsman.  A native of Asunción, he later moved to Buenos Aires, where he died.  He was friends with Arturo Alsina, the playwright.

1904 births
1944 deaths
20th-century Paraguayan painters
People from Asunción
Paraguayan expatriates in Argentina